Ryangelo "Angelo" Cijntje (born 9 November 1980) is a Curaçaoan former professional footballer, who played most of his career as a right back for BV Veendam.

Club career
Cijntje played eight seasons with SC Veendam before appearing to leave the club when it was declared bankrupt in May 2010. However, initially the club was able to have its bankruptcy reversed and he continued playing for the club in the following season. The following season, Veendam were struggling financially again, and eventually went bankrupt on 25 March 2013. As a free agent, Cijntje signed for FC Groningen the next season, playing in the reserves for most of the season. In April 2014, Cijntje appeared on the bench during a couple of Groningen's Eredivisie matches. 

A few weeks later, he made his debut for the club. On 3 May 2014, in the home match against Heracles Almelo, Cijntje came on as a substitute for Nick van der Velden in the 84th minute, making his debut for the club at age 33. During the minutes he played in the game, the Groningen supporters were chanting his name and singing "All balls on Cijntje". He retired from professional football at the end of the season and signed with Hoofdklasse side ACV Assen. From the 2016–17 season, Cijntje played three seasons for Veendam 1894. He retired from football altogether in May 2019, after suffering a series of injuries.

International career
Cijntje made his debut for the Netherlands Antilles in a January 2004 friendly match against Surinam. He then played in all four World Cup qualifying matches they played later that year.

International goals
Score and results list Curaçao's goal tally first.

References

External links 

 Voetbal International profile 

1980 births
Living people
Association football defenders
Dutch Antillean footballers
Curaçao footballers
Netherlands Antilles international footballers
Curaçao international footballers
SC Heerenveen players
SC Veendam players
FC Groningen players
Kuopion Palloseura players
Veikkausliiga players
Eredivisie players
Eerste Divisie players
Expatriate footballers in Finland
People from Willemstad
Dual internationalists (football)
Asser Christelijke Voetbalvereniging players
VV Spijkenisse players